Mary Elle Fanning (born April 9, 1998) is an American actress. She made her film debut as the younger version of her sister Dakota Fanning's character in the drama film I Am Sam (2001). As a child actress, she appeared in several films, including Babel (2006), The Curious Case of Benjamin Button, and Phoebe in Wonderland (both 2008). In 2010 she starred in Sofia Coppola's  Somewhere (2010) earning her a Critics' Choice Movie Award for Best Young Performer nomination. In 2011 she received attention for her starring role in J. J. Abrams' science-fiction film Super 8, earning a Spotlight Award at the Hollywood Film Festival. She subsequently had leading roles in the comedy-drama film We Bought a Zoo (2011), the drama film Ginger & Rosa (2012), and as Princess Aurora in the fantasy films Maleficent (2014) and Maleficent: Mistress of Evil (2019). 

Following Maleficent, Fanning began working in independent cinema, collaborating with auteurs in lead and supporting roles in films such as Nicolas Winding Refn's The Neon Demon (2016), Mike Mills' 20th Century Women (2016), Sofia Coppola's The Beguiled (2017), John Cameron Mitchell's How to Talk to Girls at Parties (2017), Woody Allen's A Rainy Day in New York (2019), and Sally Potter's The Roads Not Taken (2020). In 2019, aged 21, she became the youngest person to serve as a jury member at the Cannes Film Festival. She plays Empress Catherine II in the Hulu series The Great (2020–present), for which she received a Primetime Emmy Award for Outstanding Lead Actress in a Comedy Series nomination as well as two Golden Globe Award for Best Actress – Television Series Musical or Comedy nominations and three Screen Actors Guild Award nominations. In 2022 she starred as Michelle Carter in the Hulu limited series The Girl from Plainville.

Early life
Fanning was born in Conyers, Georgia, to Heather Joy (née Arrington), who played tennis in college, and Steven J. Fanning, who played minor league baseball for teams affiliated with the St. Louis Cardinals.

Her maternal grandfather was American football player Rick Arrington, and her aunt is ESPN reporter Jill Arrington. Counted amongst the Arrington family's most notable ancestors is the gentleman farmer William Farrar. Fanning is the younger sister of Dakota Fanning, who is also an actress. Both were brought up in the Southern Baptist denomination.

Career

2001–2013: Child actress and breakthrough
Fanning started acting before turning three years old. She began her acting career by playing the younger version of her older sister Dakota's characters in the miniseries Taken and the film I Am Sam. In 2002, at the age of four, Fanning won her first role independent of her sister in the comedy Daddy Day Care. She was cast for the role of Ruth in The Door in the Floor (2004) opposite Jeff Bridges and Kim Basinger. The film's producers originally planned to hire identical twins for the intense shooting schedule, but were so impressed with Fanning that they used only her. Late in 2003, Fanning appeared in Because of Winn-Dixie in the small role of Sweetie Pie Thomas. In 2004, she did voice work in the English-dubbed version of Hayao Miyazaki's animated film My Neighbor Totoro, in the role of Mei, opposite Dakota, who voiced Satsuki, the older sister to Elle's character. Later that same year, she filmed I Want Someone to Eat Cheese With.

In early 2005, Fanning filmed scenes in Charlotte's Web as the "future granddaughter" of Fern Arable played by Dakota. The scenes did not make the final cut. In mid-2005, she played Debbie, the daughter of Richard and Susan Jones (played by Brad Pitt and Cate Blanchett) in the film Babel. In early 2006, Fanning filmed scenes in both The Nines and Déjà Vu. In mid-2006, she filmed The Lost Room, a science-fiction TV miniseries. Also in 2006, she appeared on the episode "Need to Know" of House: MD, playing the patient's daughter. She appeared in an episode of Criminal Minds in 2006, playing the supporting role of Tracey in "The Boogeyman". By the end of 2006, Fanning began to book lead roles. The first of these was the one of Emma Learner in Reservation Road—the grieving daughter of Grace and Ethan Learner. The film deals with the aftermath of a tragic car accident in which Emma's brother is killed.

In early 2007, Fanning reunited with her Babel co-stars, Brad Pitt and Cate Blanchett, in a small part in The Curious Case of Benjamin Button as the younger version of Blanchett's character. Mid-year 2007, Fanning filmed the title role Phoebe of Phoebe in Wonderland, which also starred Felicity Huffman and was released in March 2009. From July through October 2007, Fanning appeared in The Nutcracker in 3D, playing Mary. It was released in late 2010. In March 2008, Fanning and her sister Dakota were scheduled to star in My Sister's Keeper, but the opportunity fell through when Dakota learned she would have to shave her head. The sisters were replaced by Abigail Breslin and Sofia Vassilieva.

Variety reported in April 2009 that Fanning would be starring in screenwriter Sofia Coppola's 2010 film Somewhere. The plot centers around a "bad-boy" actor who is forced to re-evaluate his life when his daughter, played by Fanning, arrives unexpectedly. The film was released during the 2010 awards season. At its first film festival, the 67th Venice Film Festival, it took the Golden Lion. In late 2010, Fanning began working on Francis Ford Coppola's 2011 film Twixt, which Coppola based on a dream. She played the role of a young ghost named "V". In 2011, Fanning starred in J. J. Abrams' science-fiction drama film Super 8 as Alice Dainard. The film was released on June 10, 2011, and centers around a group of children who are forced to deal with strange happenings in their small town. The Telegraph cited Fanning as one of the film's best aspects and she received a Spotlight Award at the Hollywood Film Festival.

In December 2011, Fanning appeared in Cameron Crowe's We Bought a Zoo. She played Lily, a 13-year-old who is working at the zoo's restaurant and lives on the property with her only parental figure, Kelly (Scarlett Johansson). In September 2012, Fanning starred as Ginger along with Alice Englert (who played Rosa) in the drama film Ginger & Rosa that took place during 1962 in London. The film was directed by Sally Potter and was released on October 19, 2012. Fanning has received widespread acclaim for her performance, with A. O. Scott of The New York Times writing that she "shows a nearly Streepian mixture of poise, intensity, and technical precision. It is frightening how good she is and hard to imagine anything she could not do." Ty Burr, film critic for The Boston Globe, praised her "luminous naturalism that seems the opposite of performance" and felt that "Fanning easily convinces you of Ginger's emotional reality."

2014–present: International recognition
Fanning starred alongside Angelina Jolie in the 2014 Walt Disney film, Maleficent, directed by Robert Stromberg. Jolie played Maleficent, while Fanning played Princess Aurora, the Sleeping Beauty. The same year, she appeared in the independent science-fiction Western Young Ones and starred in the biographical Low Down, about the life of jazz pianist Joe Albany, in which she plays the role of Albany's daughter, Amy-Jo, from whose perspective the story is told. In 2015, Fanning co-starred in Jay Roach's Trumbo as Dalton Trumbo's (Bryan Cranston) daughter Nikola, and starred in 3 Generations (previously known as About Ray), alongside Naomi Watts and Susan Sarandon, playing the role of a young transgender man.

In 2016, she appeared as Jesse in the psychological thriller The Neon Demon, directed by Nicolas Winding Refn. The film had its world premiere at the Cannes Film Festival in May 2016. It was released on June 24, 2016, and did poorly at the box office. That same year, she appeared in Mike Mills's 20th Century Women, opposite Greta Gerwig and Annette Bening. The film had its world premiere at the New York Film Festival on October 8, 2016, and began a limited release on December 28, 2016. She then co-starred in Ben Affleck's Prohibition-era drama Live by Night, which was released on December 25, 2016.

In 2017, Fanning appeared in Shawn Christensen's feature-length drama The Vanishing of Sidney Hall, which premiered on January 25 at the Sundance Film Festival. In the same year, Fanning appeared in John Cameron Mitchell's British-American science-fiction romantic comedy film How to Talk to Girls at Parties (based on a short story by Neil Gaiman), reuniting with Sofia Coppola in The Beguiled, in the Irish-American romance film Mary Shelley, directed by Haifaa al-Mansour, and in the music video for Grouplove's single "Good Morning".

In 2018, Fanning starred alongside Peter Dinklage in I Think We're Alone Now, directed by Reed Morano. It had its world premiere at the Sundance Film Festival on January 21, 2018. and was released on September 14, 2018, by Momentum Pictures. She also starred in Galveston opposite Ben Foster, directed by Mélanie Laurent, which had its world premiere at South by Southwest on March 10, 2018. That same year, Fanning starred in Teen Spirit, directed by Max Minghella, which had its world premiere at the Toronto International Film Festival in September 2018. It was released on April 5, 2019.

In May 2019, Fanning was appointed as a jury member of the international competition in the 72nd annual Cannes Film Festival, becoming the youngest Cannes juror in history. That same year, Fanning starred in Woody Allen's A Rainy Day in New York. In October 2019, Fanning reprised the role of Aurora in Maleficent: Mistress of Evil. In 2020, Fanning starred in All the Bright Places, opposite Justice Smith, directed by Brett Haley, based upon the novel of the same name by Jennifer Niven, and The Roads Not Taken, directed by Sally Potter, opposite Javier Bardem and Salma Hayek. That same year, Fanning starred in and executive produced the historical comedy series The Great, starring as Catherine the Great alongside Nicholas Hoult. The series premiered on Hulu in May 2020. Fanning received critical acclaim for the role and was nominated in the 2021 Golden Globe Award for Best Actress – Television Series Musical or Comedy. Her performance also earned her, her first Primetime Emmy Award nomination for Outstanding Lead Actress in a Comedy Series.

She starred in the 2022 Hulu miniseries The Girl from Plainville, playing Michelle Carter, based on the death of Conrad Roy.

Fanning will next star in The Nightingale, based upon the novel of the same name alongside her sister Dakota, reuniting her with Laurent. More recently, Elle and Dakota started Lewellen Pictures with a first look deal at MRC.

Filmography

Film

Television

Video games

Awards and nominations

Solo awards

Ensemble awards

Notes

References

External links

 
 

21st-century American actresses
Actresses from Georgia (U.S. state)
American child actresses
American film actresses
American television actresses
American voice actresses
Living people
People from Conyers, Georgia
1998 births